Panmure Gordon is a UK based investment bank. It provides a full range of services including investment banking, trading, research and sales with distribution to the UK, Europe and the US. Panmure Gordon has 150 UK listed corporate clients, over 400 institutional clients, provides research on over 200 companies, makes markets in over 400 stocks and offers broad coverage of publicly listed companies.

The firm is headquartered in the City of London at 40 Gracechurch Street.

Employing 150 people, Panmure Gordon is led by chief executive, Rich Ricci, who was appointed in 2020.

In 2009, Panmure Gordon welcomed QInvest, the leading investment bank in Qatar, as a strategic investor. In 2017 Panmure Gordon was acquired by Ellsworthy Limited, an entity owned and controlled by QInvest LLC and by a wholly owned subsidiary of a fund managed by Atlas Merchant Capital LLC.

History
The firm was founded in 1876 by Harry Panmure Gordon (1837-September 1, 1902) as Gordon & Co. and was subsequently renamed H. Panmure Gordon & Company.  The firm's founder was a well-known member of the financial community in London and in 1892 H. Panmure Gordon wrote the book Land of the Almighty Dollar, a critical review of the U.S., particularly New York and Chicago. Panmure Gordon initially specialized in debt offerings for foreign governments.  The firm also developed a reputation for conducting offerings for a large number of British and American breweries, including for the San Francisco Brewing Company in 1890.

The company remained a small but influential player, primarily acting as a broker for a number of foreign governments.  However, the firm largely avoids the wave of consolidation in the 1960s and 1970s, making only one small acquisition with the purchase of Windsor & Mabey in 1961.

In 1987, the firm was acquired by NationsBank (later part of Bank of America ending more than a century as an independent firm.  The firm would be sold again in 1996 to the German bank WestLB, however, the firm would languish as the overall bank experienced various issues in the late 1990s and early 2000s.  As part of a major restructuring of the bank, Panmure Gordon was sold again in 2004 to Lazard for the nominal amount of $18 million.  In February 2005, Lazard merged Panmure Gordon with a small listed brokerage firm, Durlacher.  The combination resulted in Panmure Gordon once again becoming an independent firm with Lazard retaining a 33% stake in the company which was listed on London's AIM.

In 2006, the firm entered into a joint venture with the Bank of Scotland, known as Panmure Capital, that provided financing for companies that are close to an initial public offering on London's AIM.  In March 2007 Panmure Gordon acquired ThinkEquity Partners, LLC a US-based investment bank.

By 2007, Lazard had sold its remaining interest in the firm and amidst the Financial crisis of 2007–2009, Panmure Gordon instead raised capital from outside investors.  In April, Panmure Gordon announced that it had received a £17.3 million cash injection from BlueGem Capital Partners, a private equity firm.  However, subsequently a higher bidder emerged and on 6 August 2009 the company announced the completion of a sale of a 47.1% stake in the business to QInvest, the largest investment bank in Qatar.

References

Further reading
H. Panmure Gordon.  Land of the Almighty Dollar London: Frederick Warne & Co., 1892
B. H. D. MacDermot.  Panmure Gordon & Co., 1876-1976: a century of stockbroking.  1976

External links
 

Stockbrokers
Investment management companies of the United Kingdom
Financial services companies established in 1876
Banks established in 1876
Investment banks
Banks of the United Kingdom
Financial services companies based in the City of London
Brokerage firms
1876 establishments in England